Take the Stand is a 1934 American mystery film directed by Phil Rosen and starring Jack LaRue, Thelma Todd, and Gail Patrick. It was released on September 7, 1934.

Cast
 Jack LaRue as George Gaylord
 Thelma Todd as Sally Oxford
 Gail Patrick as Cornelia Burbank
 Russell Hopton as Bill Hamilton
 Berton Churchill as Jerome Burbank
 Vince Barnett as Tony
 Leslie Fenton as Hugh Halliburton
 Sheila Terry as Pearl Reynolds
 Paul Hurst as Denny O'Brien
 De Witt Jennings as the police commissioner

References

External links 
 
 
 

1934 mystery films
American mystery films
American black-and-white films
Films directed by Phil Rosen
1930s American films